The 2013–14 Radford Highlanders men's basketball team represented Radford University during the 2013–14 NCAA Division I men's basketball season. The Highlanders, led by third year head coach Mike Jones, played their home games at the Dedmon Center and were members of the North Division of the Big South Conference. They finished the season 22–13, 10–6 in Big South play to finish in third place in the North Division. They advanced to the quarterfinals of the Big South Conference tournament where they lost to UNC Asheville. They were invited to the College Basketball Invitational where they defeated Oregon State in the first round before losing in the quarterfinals to Old Dominion.

Roster

Schedule
Source:

|-
!colspan=9 style="background:#ff0000; color:#ffffff;"| Regular season

|-
!colspan=9 style="background:#ff0000; color:#ffffff;"| Big South tournament

|-
!colspan=9 style="background:#ff0000; color:#ffffff;"| CBI

References 

Radford Highlanders men's basketball seasons
Radford
Radford
Radford Highlanders men's basketball
Radford Highlanders men's basketball